Paratheocris viridis is a species of beetle in the family Cerambycidae. It was described by Per Olof Christopher Aurivillius in 1907, originally under the genus Theocris. It is known from Cameroon.

References

Endemic fauna of Cameroon
Theocridini
Beetles described in 1907